A number of political parties in Nepal strive to provide ethnic group(s) with better living conditions within the country, counter discrimination, or some sort of autonomy for various regions or ethnic groups.  The following is a list of those parties with this explicitly stated goal.

Ethnicity

All minority ethnicity 

 People's Socialist Party, Nepal

Dalits 

 Bahujan Samaj Party Nepal
 Bahujan Shakti Party, Nepal
 Dalit Janajati Party
 Nepal Dalit Shramik Morcha

Madhesi 

 Madhesi Janadhikar Forum Madhesh

Loktantrik Samajwadi Party, Nepal
Terai Madhesh Loktantrik Party
Janamat Party

 Nepali Janata Dal

Janajati 
 Dalit Janajati Party
Federal Limbuwan State Council
Federal Socialist Party, Nepal
Khambuwan Rashtriya Morcha Nepal
Mongol National Organisation
Nepa Rastriya Party
Prajatantrik Janamukti Party
Rastriya Janamukti Party
Sanghiya Loktantrik Rastriya Manch
 Tamsaling Nepal Rastriya Dal
Tharuhat Tarai Party Nepal

Geographical area 

 Chure Bhawar Rastriya Ekta Party Nepal – Churia Hills

Landless and squatters 

 Nepal Sukumbasi Party (Loktantrik)

Religion

Christian 

 Nepal Pariwar Dal

Hinduism 

 Rastriya Prajatantra Party
 Hindu Prajatantrik Party
 Nepal Janata Party
 Shanti Party Nepal 
 Shiva Sena Nepal

See also 
 List of political parties in Nepal

References

Regional and ethnicity based
Political parties of minorities